Willoughby Charles Allen (7 October 1867 – 10 February 1953) was an Anglican priest in the early 20th century.

He was educated at the Clergy Orphan School in Canterbury and Exeter College, Oxford. He was ordained in 1894 and began his ecclesiastical career as a curate in South Hinksey. He was a Fellow of His old college until 1908 when he became Principal of Egerton Hall, Manchester. He was  Archdeacon of Manchester from 1909 to 1916; Archdeacon of Blackburn from 1916 to  1920; and  Rector  of Saham Toney from 1922 to 1932.

References

1867 births
People educated at St Edmund's School Canterbury
Alumni of Exeter College, Oxford
Archdeacons of Manchester
Archdeacons of Blackburn
1953 deaths